Santa Fe is the third locality of Bogotá, Capital District of Colombia. Santa Fe is part of the traditional downtown of the city of Bogotá, the area where the city was founded by Gonzalo Jiménez de Quesada on August 6, 1538. This area once comprised Bogotá's total main urban area and was known as "Santa Fe de Bogotá" with its traditional neighbourhoods.

Santa Fe hosts some of the main business areas in Bogotá, and is served by the Carrera Séptima, one of the main arteries of the city. The locality hosts most of Bogotá's skyscrapers. The International Center and the financial district along the Avenida Jiménez are also located within Santa Fe.

The main streets of central Bogotá intersect in Santa Fe: Carrera Séptima, formerly known as Calle Real (Royal Street), Carrera Décima, Calle 26, Avenida Circunvalar, Avenida Caracas, Avenida Ciudad de Lima and Avenida Jiménez.

Santa Fe also has a rural area located in the Eastern Hills of which Monserrate and Guadalupe are the main landmarks. The locality of La Candelaria was the location where Santa Fe de Bogotá was founded and is an enclave in the middle of the locality Santa Fe. La Candelaria was separated from Santa Fe after the creation of the Capital District.

History 

Bogotá was founded by Gonzalo Jiménez de Quesada on August 6, 1538, under the name of Santa Fe de Bogotá. The legal foundation occurred at the Bolívar Square in La Candelaria between the rivers of San Francisco (now Avenida Jiménez) and San Agustin (now Calle 6).

During the early years of the 20th century, the city was confined within the present territory of Santa Fe, until the 1920s when urbanization expanded towards Chapinero and later towards the west. The westward expansion happened in the 1950s, just after the violent days of El Bogotazo that partially destroyed the streets.

Santa Fe got a minor city hall in 1972. With the Constitutional reform of 1991, Santa Fe legally became a locality (or a Local Action Junta) of the Capital District.

General data 

Santa Fe had a population of 107,044 people according to the 1993 census.

To the north, Santa Fe is bordered by the Canal Arzobispo or Calle 39, bordering the locality of Chapinero. To the south, it is bordered by Avenida Primera, with San Cristóbal. In the east, it is bordered by the Eastern Hils, bordering with the municipalities of Choachí and Ubaque in Cundinamarca. Lastly, the city is bordered in the west by the Avenida Caracas, with Teusaquillo, Los Mártires and Antonio Nariño.

Among the neighbourhoods there are Las Cruces, Los Laches, La Perseverancia, La Concordia, Santa Inés, Santa Bárbara, San Bernardo, La Merced, Egipto, Germania, Las Aguas, La Paz, La Peña, Liévano, Las Nieves, El Consuelo, Belén, Egipto Alto, Central, El Rocío, Tisquesuza, La Macarena and El Bosque Izquierdo. Veredas are Monserrate and El Vergel.

Santa Fe is crossed by the San Francisco River, San Agustín River, Arzobispo River and San Cristóbal River. Because of its proximity to the Eastern Hills, the urban area near these mountains is tilted some 40 degrees.

Economy 
Santa Fe is mostly a commercial area with some small factories and service companies such as financial businesses, hotels and tourism facilities. There are some important universities in the area such as University of the Andes, Universidad Externado de Colombia, Jorge Tadeo Lozano University and others.

Transport 
TransMilenio operates along the Avenida Caracas (lines A and H), Carrera Séptima (line M), Avenida Jiménez (line J) and a short segment of Calle 26 (line K). A funicular and an aerial tramway to climb Monserrate exist since 1926.

Sites of interest 

 BD Bacatá
 Colombian National Museum
 Colpatria Tower
 The Gold Museum
 The National Library of Colombia
 The Santamaría Bullring
 The churches of San Francisco, la Tercera, la Veracruz and la Capuchina
 Las Cruces Marketplace
 Independence Park, Tercer Milenio Park and the Olaya Herrera National Park
 The Natural History Museum
 The Planetarium
 La Rebeca
 Avianca Tower

Notes and references

External links 

 
  Sitio de la Universidad Nacional sobre Santa Fe
 

Localities of Bogotá